State Route 136 (SR 136) is a state highway in the central portion of the U.S. state of Tennessee.

It connects US 70S near Rock Island in Warren County with SR 52 in northern Overton County, traversing much of the northeastern Highland Rim.

Route description
SR 136 begins in Warren County at an intersection with US 70S just south of Rock Island. The route proceeds north to Rock Island and junctions with SR 287, which connects it to Rock Island State Park to the west. SR 136 then bridges the Caney Fork River and enters White County before turning northeast through the community of Walling. It then turns northward again and continues through mostly rural terrain.

After several miles it junctions with US 70 west of Sparta, and SR 135 at Bakers Crossroads, near the Putnam County line. It turns eastward briefly after passing the Upper Cumberland Regional Airport before it has an interchange with SR 111 at Hampton Crossroads, and joins SR 111 for a short distance before diverging again near Cookeville. As it continues into downtown Cookeville, the road widens to four lanes, and crosses an interchange with Interstate 40 (I-40). SR 136 follows Jefferson Avenue through much of Cookeville before briefly turning eastward at the courthouse square, and then northward again along Washington Avenue. Near Cookeville High School at the northern edge of the city, the road narrows for a final time to two lanes.

After it leaves Cookeville, SR 136 continues through rural terrain, passing through the community of Bangham before crossing Spring Creek and entering Overton County and the Hardy's Chapel community. At the community of Hilham, the road intersects SR 85 at a crossroads designed in the late 18th century to align with the four cardinal directions. In the park, the road descends sharply to Standing Stone Lake, narrows to one lane as it crosses Standing Stone Dam, and widens again to two lanes as it reascends to the ridgeline and passes the park's cabins and headquarters. After leaving the park SR 136 turns eastward and ends at SR 52 at the old Timothy community. SR 52 continues southeastward to Livingston and northwestward to Celina.

Major intersections

References

External links

136
Transportation in Warren County, Tennessee
Transportation in White County, Tennessee
Transportation in Putnam County, Tennessee
Transportation in Overton County, Tennessee